The Silver Star is a medal awarded for gallantry in action while in combat as a member of any of the United States Armed Forces.

Silver Star may also refer to:

 Edelweiss, a flower
 Silver award star, an attachment worn on meritorious medals of the United States Department of the Navy
 Silver service star, an attachment worn on campaign medals and service decorations
 A religious term used in Western Initiatory Kabbalah

Entertainment
 "Silver Star" (1910 song), a popular song composed in 1910 by Charles L. Johnson
 Silver Star (album), a 1977 Gary Glitter album
 "Silver Star" (The Four Seasons song), 1976
 Lunar: The Silver Star, a GameArts RPG released in North America in 1993 for the Sega CD
 Lunar: Silver Star Story Complete a GameArts RPG released in North America in 1999 for the PlayStation
 Silver Star (comics), a Pacific Comics and Topps Comics comic book by Jack Kirby
 Silver Stars (reggae), a reggae group led by Clancy Eccles
 "Silver Star" (The Unit), an episode of the television series The Unit
 The Silver Star (film), a 1955 American film

Locations
 Silver Star Provincial Park, a provincial park in British Columbia, Canada
 Silver Star Mountain Resort, in British Columbia, Canada, located near the provincial park
 Silver Star Mountain (disambiguation), multiple mountains in Washington, United States

Organisations
 Silver Star (charity), a British-based diabetes charity
 Argenteum Astrum (Latin for silver star), a magical order created by Aleister Crowley in 1907 after leaving the Hermetic Order of the Golden Dawn

Sport
 Silver Stars (South Africa), a South African Premier Soccer League club
 San Antonio Silver Stars, a team in the Women's National Basketball Association (WNBA) based in San Antonio, Texas

Vehicles
 CT-133 Silver Star, a Canadian military training aircraft
 Silver Star (Amtrak train), a passenger train operated by the National Railroad Passenger Corporation (Amtrak)
 Silver Star (NZR train), a luxury passenger train that ran in New Zealand
 Silver Star (roller coaster), a hypercoaster and Europe's highest and third fastest roller coaster

See also
 Silverstar (disambiguation)
 Silver (disambiguation)
 Star (disambiguation)
 Silver Award (disambiguation)
 Silver medal
 Gold Star (disambiguation)
 Bronze Star
 Award star
 Eun-byul, a Korean feminine given name which sometimes means "silver star"